Hiding Small Things In Obvious Places is the first studio EP by Canadian band Riverbeds, which was recorded over the course of few months in 2011 and 2012. It was produced by Riverbeds and Alex Perreault, owner of Soundwave Studios and released on CD and digital download on November 24, 2012. The album features "a midly dark and enticing combination of alternative riffs and post-hardcore elements, filled with magnetic instrumentals". The sound on this EP is much more refined than what fans are usually used to during live performances. It is considered an EP because it features only five songs, even though it runs for almost half an hour.

Track listing
"Removing The Head" – 5:41
"Iron" – 5:28
"Cortex" – 5:59
"Years" – 5:36
"Dark" – 7:00

Videos
Removing The Head - (2011) (official video on YouTube)

Personnel

Riverbeds
 Alexandre Duhamel Gingras – bass, backing vocals
 Charles-André Chamard – drums, vocals 
 Fred Béland – guitar, backing vocals
 Vincent Pigeon – vocals, guitar, keyboard

Other
 Alex Perreault - producer 
 François-Phillipe Pelletier - album design
 Mathieu Coudé - front cover

References

External links

2012 EPs